Exechodontes is a monospecific genus of marine ray-finned fish belonging to the family Zoarcidae, the eelpouts. Its only species is Exechodontes daidaleus which is found in the Western Atlantic Ocean.

References

Lycodinae
Fish described in 1977